Rodoljub Paunović (Serbian Cyrillic: Родољуб Пауновић; born 20 June 1985) is a Serbian professional footballer who plays as a forward.

Club career

Sabah 
In June 2017, Paunović signed for Malaysia Premier League side Sabah for 6 month contract with an option. On 30 June 2017, Paunović made his debut in a 1–0 victory over PDRM and providing an assist for Lee Kil-hoon goal. On 14 July 2017, Paunović scored the first goal for Sabah in a 0–1 away win against UiTM during league match. As in most of Sabah's matches, Paunović also become the key player on the team success to secured a place in the 2020 Malaysia Super League with many important goals delivered by him including the sole goal from 35 meters during the match against Johor Darul Ta'zim II F.C. for Sabah to lead the league table in 2019 Malaysia Premier League.

References

External links
 Rodoljub Paunovic
 

1985 births
Living people
Serbian footballers
Association football forwards
Serbian SuperLiga players
Serbian First League players
FK Budućnost Valjevo players
FK Zemun players
FK BASK players
FK Hajduk Kula players
FK Jedinstvo Užice players
FK Kolubara players
Rodoljub Paunovic
Rodoljub Paunovic
Rodoljub Paunovic
Sabah F.C. (Malaysia) players
Expatriate footballers in Thailand
Expatriate footballers in Malaysia
Serbian expatriate footballers
Serbian expatriate sportspeople in Thailand
Serbian expatriate sportspeople in Malaysia